Oliver Pongratz (born 14 April 1973) is a German former badminton player. He competed in the men's singles tournament at the 1996 Summer Olympics.

References

External links
 

1973 births
Living people
German male badminton players
Olympic badminton players of Germany
Badminton players at the 1996 Summer Olympics
People from Mindelheim
Sportspeople from Swabia (Bavaria)